The annual election to the Labour Party's Shadow Cabinet (more formally, its "Parliamentary Committee") was conducted in 1987. In addition to the 16 members elected, the Leader (Neil Kinnock), Deputy Leader (Roy Hattersley), Labour Chief Whip (Derek Foster), Labour Leader in the House of Lords (Cledwyn Hughes), and Chairman of the Parliamentary Labour Party (Stan Orme) were automatically members.

Following the 1987 general election, there were significant changes to the cabinet. Barry Jones, Peter Shore, Peter Archer and Giles Radice lost their seats, and other familiar faces such as Denis Healey did not stand. Michael Meacher, Robert Hughes, Robin Cook, Frank Dobson, Gordon Brown, Jo Richardson and Jack Straw gained seats.

Footnotes
Notes

References

1987
1987 elections in the United Kingdom